, stylized as MELODY, is a Japanese josei manga magazine published on the 28th of even-numbered months by Hakusensha since August 28, 1997 (cover date September 1997), initially published as a shōjo manga magazine.

Serializations
The following is a partial list of titles serialized in Melody:

Current
  by Minako Narita (since 2001)
  by Kyoko Hikawa (since 2009)
 Idol Dreams by Arina Tanemura (since 2013)
 Kageki Shojo!! by Kumiko Saiki (since 2015)
  by Saki Hiwatari (since 2018)
 Rhythm Nation by Tomo Matsumoto (since 2020)
 The Vampire and His Pleasant Companions by Narise Konohara and Marimo Ragawa (since 2022)

Former
 Patalliro! by Mineo Maya (1997–2016)
  by Reiko Okano and Baku Yumemakura (1999–2005)
 Bright no Yūutsu by Keiko Takemiya (2000–2004)
 Shūdōshi Falco by Yasuko Aoike (2001)
 Gatcha Gacha by Yutaka Tachibana (2001–2007)
 Himitsu – Top Secret by Reiko Shimizu (2001–2012)
 All My Darling Daughters by Fumi Yoshinaga (2002–2003)
 Ōoku: The Inner Chambers by Fumi Yoshinaga (2004–2020)
 Tom Sawyer by Shin Takahashi (2004–2006)
  by Kyoko Hikawa (2006–2008)
  by Mikoto Asou (2007–2018)
 Please, Jeeves by Bun Katsuta (2008–2014)
  by Keiko Nishi (2008–2011)
  by Reiko Okano and Baku Yumemakura (2010–2017)
  by Keiko Nishi (2011–2014)
  by Shin Takahashi (2013)
  by Shin Takahashi (2014–2015)
  by Shin Takahashi (2019–present)

Notes

References

External links
  
 

1997 establishments in Japan
Bi-monthly manga magazines published in Japan
Hakusensha magazines
Josei manga magazines
Magazines established in 1997
Magazines published in Tokyo
Shōjo manga magazines